Jogo de Damas (aka "Game of Checkers") is a 2015 Portuguese drama film directed and written by Patrícia Sequeira and Filipa Leal, and starring , Ana Padrão,  and Rita Blanco. It premiered on the Lisbon & Estoril Film Festival in November 2015 and was released in Portugal on January 28, 2016.

Synopsis
Following Marta's wake, her five best friends decide to spend the night at a rural tourist getaway that Marta never got around to opening. That long night becomes a maze-like journey through their interconnecting friendships, where each reveals herself as it was the last day. On the eve of the burial, the talk is about life and a friendship that survived it all. But will this friendship be able to survive death?

Cast 
 as Maria
Ana Padrão as Dalila
 as Ema
 as Ana
Rita Blanco as Mónica

Production
The film had a budget of €140,000 and the shooting took place in November 2014.

It is the first feature film of R.I. FILMES, the production company of Patrícia Sequeira.

Reception
As of February 10, 2016, the film had grossed €24,064.72 and had 4,976 admissions, being the highest-grossing Portuguese film of the year so far at the Portuguese box office.

International recognition 
"Game of Checkers" has already received 20 awards, 30 nominations, and 21 official selections.

References

External links

Portuguese drama films
2015 directorial debut films
2015 films
Films featuring an all-female cast
2015 drama films